Cynorkis elegans is an orchid species in the genus Cynorkis found in Madagascar.

References 

Orchideae
Orchids of Madagascar
Plants described in 1888